Little work has been done on the lichens of Madagascar, so while over 500 species of lichens have been documented, more are expected. Madagascar can be divided into two major habitats that can be associated with lichen distribution. Wet tropical areas of siliceous bedrock make up approximately two-thirds of the country, and are where most of the lichens have been documented. Dry tropical areas of granitic and limestone bedrock make up the other one-third of the country with just over 20 species documented in these habitats. The following table lists the species known from the dry tropical habitats. The majority are corticolous species that grow on the bark of trees or shrubs. A few are saxicolous; species that grow on rocks.

While many of the lichens found to date in Madagascar are relatively widespread, tropical species, some are endemic. Isalonactis madagascariensis, for example, is known only from its type locality near Isalo National Park, and new species continue to be found.

Gallery

References

Lists of lichens
Biota of Madagascar